Alan Lawrence Passarell (April 22, 1950 – September 29, 1986) was a Canadian politician who served as a Member of the Legislative Assembly of British Columbia representing the riding of Atlin from 1979 to 1986.  He was in the New Democratic Party until October 1985, when he switched to the British Columbia Social Credit Party.

Passarell lived in a log cabin without a telephone.  Before becoming a politician, he was a school principal.  In 1979, he won his seat by one vote, and was subsequently known as "Landslide Al".  As a MLA, he was known for advocating positions for Northern British Columbia.   He garnered headlines for his tall tale about fighting a grizzly bear.

Passarell died when a plane he was on crashed into Dease Lake.

References

1950 births
1986 deaths
British Columbia New Democratic Party MLAs
British Columbia Social Credit Party MLAs
People from the Regional District of Kitimat–Stikine
Politicians from Detroit
Accidental deaths in British Columbia
Victims of aviation accidents or incidents in Canada
Victims of aviation accidents or incidents in 1986